Wendell James Bennett (born March 24, 1950) is a Canadian former professional ice hockey player who played in the World Hockey Association (WHA). Bennett played with the Phoenix Roadrunners during the 1974–75 WHA season. He was drafted in the third round of the 1970 NHL Amateur Draft by the New York Rangers.

References

External links

1950 births
Canadian ice hockey defencemen
Canadian ice hockey right wingers
Ice hockey people from Saskatchewan
Kansas City Blues players
Living people
New York Rangers draft picks
Omaha Knights (CHL) players
Phoenix Roadrunners (PHL) players
Phoenix Roadrunners (WHA) players
Phoenix Roadrunners (WHL) players
Saskatoon Blades players
Tulsa Oilers (1964–1984) players
Weyburn Red Wings players
Canadian expatriate ice hockey players in the United States